Ersan Şen (born 16 July 1966) is a Turkish lawyer, legal scholar and a faculty member at the Faculty of Political Sciences of Istanbul University.

Biography
Şen was born in Nevşehir on 16 July 1966. He graduated from Kabataş Boys High School in 1983. He obtained a degree in law from Marmara University in 1987. He received his master's degree in law from Marmara University and his PhD in public law from İstanbul University. He joined Istanbul University and became a professor of law in 2004. He is a faculty member at the Faculty of Political Sciences of Istanbul University.

Şen has published various books. He announced his candidacy for the presidential election to be held in May 2023, but after the announcement of Kemal Kııçdaoğlu's candidacy for office it was not materialized.

References

20th-century Turkish lawyers
21st-century Turkish lawyers
1966 births
Living people
People from Nevşehir
Marmara University alumni
Istanbul University Faculty of Law alumni
Kabataş Erkek Lisesi alumni
Academic staff of Istanbul University